The Archdeacon of York (or of the West Riding) is a senior clergy position in an archdeaconry subdivision of the Church of England Diocese of York in the Province of York. It is named for the City of York and consists of the seven rural deaneries of Derwent, Easingwold, New Ainsty, Selby, Southern Ryedale, South Wold and York.

History
Archdeacons occurred in the Diocese of York before 1093; before 1128, there were five serving simultaneously – probably each in their own area, but none occurs with a territorial title before 1133. The title Archdeacon of York is first recorded before 1153 with Robert Butevilain, Archdeacon of York. Of the five archdeaconries, York is one of three which has never split from York diocese.

The current archdeacon is Samantha Rushton; the suffragan Bishop of Selby exercises episcopal oversight over the archdeaconry.

List of archdeacons

High Medieval
territories not recorded:
bef. 1093–aft. 1070/bef. 1114: Durand
bef. 1108–aft. 1112: Hugh
?–bef. 1114 (d.): Gerard
bef. 1115–bef. 1114 (d.): William
bef. 1135–bef. 1128: William of Beverley
bef. 1133–aft. 1125: William son of Tole
Archdeacons of York:
bef. 1128–1148 (d.): Walter of London
bef. 1153–aft. 1157: Robert Butevilain (became Dean of York)
bef. 1162–aft. 1154: Geoffrey
bef. 1171–1194 (d.): Ralph d'Aunay
bef. 1195–1199 (res.): Peter of Dinan (became Bishop of Rennes)
1196–aft. 1201: Adam of Thorner
bef. 1220–aft. 1228: Sampson
bef. 1231–aft. 1231: Walter
bef. 1241–1245 (d.): Laurence of Lincoln
bef. 1248–aft. 1248: Sewal de Bovil (became Dean of York)
aft. 1249–aft. 1252: William Langton (alias William of Rotherfield; became Dean of York)
1262: John de Langeton the elder
bef. 1262–aft. 1267: Reiner of Skipton (Reginald)
28 April 1267–May 1268 (res.): Godfrey Giffard (became Bishop of Worcester)
bef. 1270–1275 (res.): Robert Burnell (became Bishop of Bath and Wells)
bef. 1277–bef. 1283: Thomas de Wythen
13 February 1283–aft. 1287: Walter of Gloucester
5 December 1288 – 1300 (res.): William de Hambleton (became Dean of York)

Late Medieval
1300–bef. 1321 (res.): Aymo of Savoy
1321–30 September 1361 (d.): Peter Cardinal de Prés (cardinal-priest of Santa Pudenziana)
1361–29 September 1369 (d.): Stephen Cardinal Albert (cardinal-deacon of Santa Maria in Aquiro)
1370–27 August 1372 (d.): Philippe Cardinal de Cabassoles (Cardinal-Bishop of Sabina; also Archdeacon of Leicester from 1371)
1373–1374 (d.): Peter Cardinal Gomez de Albornoz (cardinal-priest of Santa Prassede)
1374–22 July 1376 (d.): Simon Cardinal Langham  (former archbishop of Canterbury; Cardinal-Bishop of Palestrina and Archdeacon of Wells)
1376–bef. 1380 (deprived): Gui Cardinal de Maillesec (cardinal-priest of Santa Croce in Gerusalemme)
1380–bef. 1383 (res.): John de Thoern
1383–bef. 1387 (res.): Peter Cardinal Corsini (Cardinal-Bishop of Porto)
aft. 1387–18 June 1405 (d.): Francis Cardinal Carboni (cardinal-priest of Santa Susanna)
1388–1405 (res.): Richard Conyngston
1405–1412: Francis Cardinal Uguccioni (cardinal-priest of Santi Quattro Coronati; probably never gained possession)
1405–1412: Roger Coryngham
2 April 1412–bef. 1435 (d.): William Pilton
1412–1414: Raynald Cardinal de Brancatiis (cardinal-deacon of Santi Vito e Modesto)
1412–27 July 1414 (res.): Francis Cardinal Zarabella (cardinal-deacon of Santi Cosma e Damiano)
21 June 1435 – 1436 (res.): William Felter (became Dean of York)
1436–1442 (res.): Thomas Kempe (became Archdeacon of Richmond)

4 December 1442–bef. 1470 (d.): Andrew Holes
1470–bef. 1478 (d.): Thomas Chippenham
14 February 1478–bef. 1497 (d.): Ralph Booth
1497–bef. 1504 (res.): Henry Carnebull
12 June 1504–bef. 1515 (res.): John Aleyne (or Carver), Archdeacon of Middlesex
15 May 1515 – 1516 (res.): Brian Higden (became Dean of York)
18 August 1516 – 1522 (d.): Hugh Ashton
1523–bef. 1540 (d.): Thomas Wynter (also Dean of Wells 1525–1529, Archdeacon of Richmond 1526–1529, Archdeacon of Suffolk 1526–1529, Archdeacon of Norfolk 1529–1530 and Archdeacon of Cornwall from 1537)
1540–bef. 1544 (d.): Thomas Westbie

Early modern
15 January 1544 – 1560 (deprived): George Palmes (deprived)
1560–29 April 1568 (d.): John Stokes
1568–6 December 1575 (res.): William Chaderton
7 December 1575–bef. 1598 (d.): Robert Ramsden
15 October 1598 – 5 October 1600 (d.): Christopher Gregorie
8 October 1600–May 1617 (d.): Roger Acroide
2 June 1617 – 1624 (res.): Henry Hooke
19 March 1624 – 1641 (d.): Henry Wickham
1641–13 October 1663 (d.): Richard Marshe (also Dean of York from 1660)
16 October 1663 – 1 August 1688 (d.): Edmund Diggle
1688–4 April 1720 (d.): Knightly Chetwood
23 May 1720 – 22 May 1730 (d.): Charles Blake
26 November 1730 – 4 September 1751 (res.): Thomas Hayter (also Bishop of Norwich from 1749; later Bishop of London)
5 September 1751 – 14 December 1776 (d.): Edmund Pyle
1777–10 July 1786 (d.): William Cooper
2 August 1786 – 28 June 1794 (res.): Charles Cooper
9 July 1794 – 17 August 1837 (d.): Robert Markham
27 September 1837 – 25 August 1845 (d.): Stuart Corbett
11 October 1845 – 31 December 1866 (res.): Stephen Creyke

Late modern
1867–1874 (res.): Basil Jones, Vicar of Bishopthorpe (became Bishop of St David's)
1874–6 February 1888 (d.): Frederick Watkins, Rector of Long Marston
1888–1923 (ret.): Robert Crosthwaite, Vicar of St Lawrence with St Nicholas, York until 1885, then Rector of Bolton Percy; also Bishop suffragan of Beverley from 1889
1923–1933 (res.): Cecil Cooper, Vicar of St Michael le Belfrey, York until 26 (became Dean of Carlisle)
1933–1946 (ret.): Arthur England
1946–1947 (res.): Thomas Layng, Rector of Burnby and Nunburnholme
1947–1957 (res.): George Townley (became Bishop suffragan of Hull)
1957–1972 (ret.): Charles Forder, Rector of Sutton-on-Derwent until 1963, then Rector of Holy Trinity Micklegate until 1966 (afterwards archdeacon emeritus)
1972–1988 (ret.): Leslie Stanbridge (afterwards archdeacon emeritus)
1988–1999 (ret.): George Austin (afterwards archdeacon emeritus)
1999–2012 (ret.): Richard Seed, Rector of Holy Trinity Micklegate from 2000 and priest-in-charge, St Mary Bishophill Junior, 2000–2004 (afterwards archdeacon emeritus)
2013–2019: Sarah Bullock (became Bishop of Shrewsbury)
1 July19 October 2019 (Acting): John Weetman
19 October 2019present: Samantha Rushton, previously Archdeacon of Cleveland

References

Sources

Diocese of York
 
Lists of English people
Archdeacon of York